

Need
In medicine, a laboratory specimen is a biological specimen of a medical patient's tissue, fluids, or other material used for laboratory analysis to assist in differential diagnosis or staging of a disease process. For example, to detect breast cancer, the breast tissue is biopsied, and the extracted specimen is sent to a lab for analysis and testing. This method of testing often yields extremely high levels of accuracy, with a reported 1-2% of cases having incorrect biopsy results

General areas for cellular tissue extraction: 

 Bone marrow aspiration 
 Cardiac 
 Core 
 Endometrial biopsy
 Endoscopic biopsy
 Excisional and incisional 
 Fine-needle aspiration 
 Lymph node

Preparation 
After extraction, all specimen containers are required to be labeled with at least two of the following identifiers (at the time of collection): patient's name, date of birth, hospital number, test request form number, accession number, or unique random number. Afterwards, all specimens should be labeled with the patient present.

Storage & Use 
Specimen temperatures are controlled for their specific use. Several common temperatures for storage are listed below.

Any specimen sample should only be used for testing, as any sharing of patient biological samples without patient consent is unethical and could heavily bias/slow research progress, not to mention grossly violate patient privacy.

Disposal 
Disposal varies based on the nature of the specimen and testing. Laboratory and healthcare personnel should follow industry standard practices regarding sterile technique and any precaution regarding needle. All biological material should be treated as potentially hazardous and in doing so protocols regarding the disposal of the specimen should be strictly followed to maintain the safety of both patients and health care workers.

References

Specimen
Biology experiments
Biological specimens